Zero is an Indian rock band that started in the late 90s. While they played what was supposed to be their last gig at Independence Rock XXIII Mumbai on 30 August 2008, they have reunited since to play gigs on an annual basis, usually at the acclaimed multi-genre musical fest, Bacardi NH7 Weekender. They are widely regarded as one of the best bands to have come out of the Indian alternate music circuit, with a fan following few others in the 'scene' have experienced.

Zero recently completed the "Two Zero One Zero" tour that ran through December 2010 to Jan 2011. The band returns to perform shows across various venues in India when all four members are in the country at the same time. Vocalist Rajeev Talwar is based outside India which is the reason why the band is not fully active.

Their popularity among collegians in India is rivalled by few. Their second album, Hook was a major hit with their fan base and was ranked as the #1 album of the decade by Indiecision.com where it is also available for free download. Hits like Lucy and PSP 12  have enthralled crowds throughout the country.

In 2012, drummer Sidd Coutto's blog work was adapted by playwright Naren Weiss for the stage, as a play entitled "The Horizon". The New Indian Express called it "a poetic account of the failing spirit of the Indie music industry."

About their third and most recent album Procrastination, this is what Split Magazine had to say:

Discography

Further reading
 Standing by with ZERO!, JAM Magazine
 Procrastination Review, Split Magazine, 2007-12-04
 Interview, Gigpad, 2004-08-30

Footnotes

External links
 Official site

Indian rock music groups
Musical groups established in 1998